An election of Members of the European Parliament representing Netherlands constituency for the 2004–2009 term of the European Parliament was held on 10 June 2004. It was part of the wider 2004 European election. Fifteen parties competed in a D'Hondt type election for 27 seats. (down from 31).

Background

Combined lists
Several parties combined in one list to take part in this European Election and increase their chance on a seat in the European Parliament.
These combined lists are:
 Christian Union and SGP

Electoral alliances
Several parties formed an electoral alliance:
 PvdA/European Social-Democrats and GreenLeft
 CDA/European People's Party and Christian Union-SGP
 VVD/European Liberal-Democrats and Democrats 66

The alliance between Christian Democratic Appeal and Christian Union-SGP cost the Christian Democratic Appeal a seat, which goes to Christian Union-SGP. Other alliances had no effect on the result.

Treaty of Nice

The exact number of seats allocated to each country is determined by the treaties, currently the Treaty of Nice, and is adjusted by the accession treaty of each new member. Hence no change to the seats occurs without ratification by all states. According to the treaties, the maximum number of members in the Parliament is 732. This why the seats for the Netherlands was reduced from 31 to 27

Numbering of the candidates list

Results

According to the European Commission, the publication of national results prior to Sunday evening is considered illegal. However, all the municipalities in the Netherlands published the results on Thursday, giving the media the opportunity to give an almost complete national result, only missing votes cast abroad. The complete and official result were publicised according to the rules.

The ruling centre-right parties, the Christian Democratic Appeal and the People's Party for Freedom and Democracy polled poorly, while the opposition Labour Party and Socialist Party gained ground. The anti-fraud party Europe Transparent of whistleblower Paul van Buitenen unexpectedly won two seats. Voter turnout was 39.26%, a lot higher than the turnout in 1999 30.02%.

Seat assignment

Electoral quota
The electoral quota is the number of votes needed for one seat.
It is the total valid number of votes divided by the number of seats.
For this election it was 4,765,677 valid votes, divided by 27 seats.
The electoral quota was established as: 176,506

Electoral alliances
The results of the electoral alliances. Both parties of both alliances reached the electoral quota and are eligible for remainder seats.

Assigning full seats
Full seats are assigned by number of votes divided by the electoral quota.
Electoral alliances are marked as a letter, instead of a number.
Any seats left over are not yet assigned to a specific party.

Remainder seats
The remaining, or left over, seats are awarded sequentially to the lists with the highest average number of votes per seat.
Only lists that reached the electoral quota are eligible.

 Europe Transparent is awarded 1 seat.
 VVD - European Liberal-Democrats and Democrats 66 (D66) electoral alliance is awarded 1 seat.
 SP (Socialist Party) is awarded 1 seat.
 P.v.d.A./European Social Democrats and GreenLeft electoral alliance is awarded 1 seat.
 CDA – European People's Party and Christian Union-SGP electoral alliance is awarded 1 seat.

Awarding seats within electoral alliances
To decide the seats per party for electoral alliances, the combination quota is first determined.
Combination quota for electoral alliances are determined by the total number valid votes divided by the awarded seats.
The party with the most votes left after the full seats are assigned gets the seat remaining.

List 1
For list 1, there were 1,444,311 votes divided by 9 seats.
The combination quota was established as: 160,479 votes

List 2
For list 2, there were 1,476,750 votes divided by 9 seats.
The combination quota was established as: 164,083 votes

List 3
For list 3, there were 831,700 votes divided by 5 seats.
The combination quota was established as: 166,340 votes

Summary:
 The CDA – European People's Party list was awarded 7 seats.
 The Christian Union-SGP list was awarded 2 seats.
 The P.v.d.A./European Social Democrats list was awarded 7 seats.
 The GreenLeft list was awarded 2 seats.
 The VVD - European Liberal-Democrats list was awarded 4 seats.
 The Democrats 66 (D66) list was awarded 1 seats.

European groups
The EPP-ED group lost 2 seats, making it just as big as the PES group. The ELDR becomes 3rd group after PES.
After the elections ELDR and European Democratic Party (EDP) formed a new European Group named ALDE in the European parliament. The EDP did not have member party's in the Netherlands. Also the Europe of Democracies and Diversities (EDD) group reforms itself with party's from Eastern-Europe. They rename their group to Independence/Democracy (ID). The Christian Union – Reformed Political Party is part of this new group.

| style="text-align:center;" colspan="11" | 
|-
|style="background-color:#E9E9E9;text-align:center;vertical-align:top;" colspan="3"|European group
!style="background-color:#E9E9E9" |Seats 1999
!style="background-color:#E9E9E9" |Seats 2004
!style="background-color:#E9E9E9" |Change
|-

| 
| style="text-align:left;" | European People's Party–European Democrats
| style="text-align:left;" | EPP-ED
| style="text-align:right;" | 9
| style="text-align:right;" | 7
| style="text-align:right;" | 2 
|-
| 
| style="text-align:left;" | Party of European Socialists
| style="text-align:left;" | PES
| style="text-align:right;" | 6
| style="text-align:right;" | 7
| style="text-align:right;" | 1 
|-
| style="background-color:gold;" width=0.3em|
| style="text-align:left;" | Alliance of Liberals and Democrats for Europe
| style="text-align:left;" | ALDE
| style="text-align:right;" | 8
| style="text-align:right;" | 5
| style="text-align:right;" | 3 
|-
| 
| style="text-align:left;" | The Greens–European Free Alliance
| style="text-align:left;" | Greens-EFA
| style="text-align:right;" | 4
| style="text-align:right;" | 4
| style="text-align:right;" | 0 
|-
| 
| style="text-align:left;" | European United Left–Nordic Green Left
| style="text-align:left;" | EUL-NGL
| style="text-align:right;" | 1
| style="text-align:right;" | 2
| style="text-align:right;" | 1 
|-
| 
| style="text-align:left;" | Independence/Democracy
| style="text-align:left;" | IND&DEM
| style="text-align:right;" | 3
| style="text-align:right;" | 2
| style="text-align:right;" | 1 
|-
| 
| style="text-align:left;" | Non-Inscrits
| style="text-align:left;" | NI
| style="text-align:right;" | 0
| style="text-align:right;" | 0
| style="text-align:right;" | 0 
|-
|width="350" style="text-align:right;background-color:#E9E9E9" colspan="3"|
|width="30" style="text-align:right;background-color:#E9E9E9"|31
|width="30" style="text-align:right;background-color:#E9E9E9"|27
|width="30" style="text-align:right;background-color:#E9E9E9"| 4 
|}

Elected members 

Below are all the elected members of European parliament. People with enough preference votes are in bold.
The following MEP were officially announced by the Central Electoral Commission on 15 June 2004:
21 members were elected by preference vote. Emine Bozkurt for the Labour Party was purely elected on his preference votes and would otherwise not made it into the European Parliament.

Christian Democratic Appeal
 Camiel Eurlings, with 938,025 votes (top candidate)
 Maria Martens, with 50,493 votes
 Albert-Jan Maat, with 30,948 votes
 Ria Oomen-Ruijten, with 29,719 votes
 Lambert van Nistelrooij, with 27,957 votes
 Bert Doorn, with 4,842 votes
 Corien Wortmann-Kool, with 9,776 votes

Labour Party
 Max van den Berg, with 879,972 votes (top candidate)
 Edith Mastenbroek, with 92,018 votes
 Jan-Marinus Wiersma, with 27,067 votes
 Emine Bozkurt, with 24,359 votes
 Dorette Corbey, with 17,847 votes
 Ieke van den Burg, with 7,695 votes
 Thijs Berman, with 6,825 votes

People's Party for Freedom and Democracy
 Jules Maaten, with 412,688 votes (top candidate)
 Jeanine Hennis-Plasschaert, with 44,064 votes
 Jan Mulder, with 43,376 votes
 Toine Manders, with 32,819 votes

GreenLeft
 Kathalijne Buitenweg, with 297,237 votes (top candidate)
 Joost Lagendijk, with 12,405 votes

Europe Transparent
 Paul van Buitenen, with 338,477 votes (top candidate)
 Els de Groen, with 4,796 votes

Socialist Party
 Erik Meijer, with 230,531 votes (top candidate)
 Kartika Liotard, with 32,187 votes

Christian Union – Reformed Political Party
 Hans Blokland (ChristianUnion), with 197,031 votes (top candidate)
 Bastiaan Belder (Reformed Political Party), with 44,473 votes

Democrats 66
 Sophie in 't Veld, with 161,104 votes (top candidate)

MEPs period 2004–2009
Below is a list of members of the European Parliament for the period 2009–2014 as a result of this election.

References 

Netherlands
European Parliament elections in the Netherlands
European Parliament election